The 1876 Dorset by-election was fought on 3 February 1876.  The byelection was fought due to the elevation to the peerage of the incumbent Conservative MP, Henry Sturt.  It was won by the Conservative candidate Edward Digby.  The other candidate stood as a "Conservative, and tenant farmer" candidate.

References

1876 in England
1876 elections in the United Kingdom
By-elections to the Parliament of the United Kingdom in Dorset constituencies
19th century in Dorset